Petro Havrylovych Dyachenko (January 30, 1895 - April 23, 1965) was Ukrainian Military Leader, commander of the Black Zaporozhets, the 2nd division of the Ukrainian National Army, the anti-tank brigade "Free Ukraine".

Military ranks — colonel of the Army of the Ukrainian People's Republic (from June 23, 1920), corporal general (with seniority from October 15, 1929; order Army of the Ukrainian People's Republic, No. 6, February 1, 1961).

The regiment of Black Zaporozhets under the leadership of Petro Dyachenko distinguished itself in the battles near Sydoriv and Voznesensk. Mykhailo Omelyanovych-Pavlenko called the Black Zaporozhian regiment the best regiment of the Ukrainian Army.

He graduated from the Real School in Myrhorod .

Participant of the First World War: a volunteer in the Russian Imperial Army, a private, later a non-commissioned officer, and after studying at the School of Ensigns in Orenburg, an officer (in 1917, a staff captain).

In 1917 he joined the army of the Ukrainian People's Republic. 1918  — a participant in the liberation of Poltava and Crimea under the command of Colonel Petro Bolbochan. A centurion (since 11/23/1918) and a henchman (since 1/17/1919 ) of a separate "partisan" henchman in the Zaporizhzhya regiment under Petro Bolbochan.

After the coming to power of Hetman Pavel Skoropadskyi on April 29, 1918, Petro Dyachenko did not leave the army, but continued his service in the cavalry hundred of the 2nd Zaporizhzhya Regiment of the Army of the Ukrainian State. During the anti-hetman uprising, the hundred was deployed in the separate horse camp named after Ataman Petro Bolbochan. On November 23, 1918, Dyachenko was appointed a centurion, and on January 17, 1919, he was appointed an officer.

Under the Command of Bolbochan 
On January 22, 1919, in Kremenchuk, by order of Simon Petliura, Omelyan Voloh arrested Colonel Petro Bolbochan , one of the most authoritative figures among the Ukrainian army. The cavalry division of centurion Petro Dyachenko immediately went to Kremenchuk to relieve its commander. By the way, in the village Kryukove, the Cossacks disarmed a unit of the Volochiv 3rd Haydamatsky Regiment, which accompanied the arrested. Only Bolbochan's personal request kept Dyachenko from further use of weapons. 

The Zaporozhians continued to take care of the fate of their beloved commander. But their requests were ignored. The appeal of the commanders of the Black Zaporozhians and division to return Colonel Bolbochan to them , which was also signed by Petro Dyachenko, remained unanswered.

Dyachenko and other Black Zaporozhian Senior Officers intended to contact the Sich riflemen and jointly seize the trains with the government and hold them until Colonel Bolbochan was released. But Bolbochan categorically forbade them to hold this action. However, when the black men learned that Colonel Bolbochan was being tortured, Petro Dyachenko prepared a strike group that was to attack the Balyn station, where the former commander of the Black Zaporozhian Cossacks was being held . This group, in addition to the Black Zaporozhian regiment , included hundreds of Nalivaikiv and Mazepyn regiments. However, without the consent of Bolbochan himself, Dyachenko did not dare to take this risky step.

When Petliura arrived at the front and the Cossacks raised the issue of the commander's return to him again, the Chief Ataman assured "that a hair will not fall from Colonel Bolbochan's head and his arrest is temporary . " Petliura confirmed the promise with the word of honor. Petro Dyachenko admitted that, when the Black Zaporozhians found out about Bolbochan's execution, Petlyura lost his popularity among the officers and Cossacks of the regiment by the end of the war .

On June 27, 1919, the Chief Ataman ordered to rename the kurin named after Petro Bolbochan to the regiment, but without the name of the disgraced colonel. That is how Petro Dyachenko became the commander of the Zaporozhian Cavalry Separate Cavalry Regiment of the Zaporozhian Corps , later renamed the Cavalry Regiment of the Black Zaporozhian Cossacks .

The First Winter Hike 
Petro Dyachenko took part in the First Winter Campaign . Knight of the Order of the Iron Cross . The regiment commanded by Dyachenko, on the eve of the Winter campaign, numbered 212 sabers, 11 heavy machine guns "Maxim", 9 light machine guns "Lewis", one cannon. A total of 417 Cossacks and officers.

On December 6, 1919, the remnants of the Ukrainian army left the Lubar  — Chortoriya  — Myropil district for the encampment of the people of Denikin . The Ukrainian army was walking through a terrible swamp against a strong wind and snow. They borrowed horses and fodder from the people of Galicia whom the soldiers of the UNR Army met near the railway line Kozyatyn  — Kalynivka (promised to return them as soon as they left the people of Denikin).

On December 11, 1919, they approached Golendra station. It was captured by the 4th Hundredth Regiment of the Black Zaporozhets almost without firing a single shot. Those Denikin residents who surrendered were captured, others who tried to escape were beheaded. Having destroyed the railway and telegraph, they moved on to Samhorodok .

On December 17, 1919, Dyachenko and fifty Cossacks attacked the volunteers in the town of Yurkivtsi . The volunteers did not have time to deploy into a row, and began to hastily shoot back with machine guns. In the attack, one of the best Cossacks of the regiment was killed - Ivan Dubin of Bunchuzh from Lokhvytsky District . Among the trophies are three heavy machine guns, 30 wagons with property, 40 officers, their wives and two dozen privates. Mykola Bredov almost fell into Ukrainian captivity during the battle . In the village of Kapitanivka , which is 20 versts from Golovanivsk , a hundred Black Zaporozhians jumped on the enemy road, attacked it, forcing it to flee. In the evening of February 1, 1920 year the regiment of chernoshlychniks entered the village to Vilshan Dyachenko declared a day of rest on February 2.

On February 8, 1920, a regiment of Black Zaporozhians jumped on Smila, after Dyachenko, together with the Mazepyn people, occupied the Bobrynska station, where they captured 11 echelons with property. It turned out to be the quartermaster of the front.

On February 13, 1920, in severe frost, the regiment of Black Zaporozhets marched through the village in a long column. Khudyaks to the Dnipro . Dyachenko together with the Cossacks moved to the left bank and began an offensive on Zolotonosha . At 7 a.m. on February 14, the Zaporozhians already left for this county town. A wild blizzard raged. At 7 o'clock in the morning on February 15, the Cossacks saw the gray buildings of Zolotonoshi. The station was occupied by the 2nd hundred. The station guard and commandant were captured. The prisoners reported that there were two special units of up to 500 men with machine guns in the city. These were international parts. 3rd and 4th hundreds under the command of lieutenant Brojewent to the city. They flew to the middle of the city without firing a single shot. But the reds began to put up stiff resistance. They had to leave in a hurry, leaving behind even the slaughtered Cossacks. It was a shame for the black men . To repel the dead, Colonel Petro Dyachenko sent the 2nd company, the rest of the 1st company and the company named after P. Sahaidachny to help. He ordered the others to advance in infantry. The enemy was pushed beyond the Zolotonoshka River , but he strengthened himself there.

Due to the lack of ammunition, the Cossacks on foot could not advance further, and the cavalry did not dare to cross the river, because the ice was extremely slippery. Having held half of the city until the evening, the Zaporizhia retreated to Dengy . On the way, they broke up the communist department. Later, the UNR Army returned to the Right Bank . The Zaporizhia crossed the Dnipro on February 18, 1920.

On March 1, 1920, the regiment of Black Zaporozhets attacked Golovanivsk . 50 communists were killed, another 60 were captured. Since Petro Dyachenko did not mention their fate in his memoirs, it is not difficult to predict that they were killed.

On March 4, 1920, the regiment went to Khoshchevata. Here the communists were supported by the local population. 40 Reds died as a result of an unexpected Zaporozhye attack.

On March 5, 1920, the black men were already in Hayvoron . Having learned from a Galician defector that the town of Bershad was occupied by the 3rd Galician Corps, which, together with the Red Army, numbered up to 12 thousand people, they decided to carry out a risky operation. Petro Dyachenko entrusted the matter to his deputy, lieutenant Brozhe. He fulfilled the task meticulously - without spilling Ukrainian blood, he disarmed the galleys, the battery and the machine gunner without firing a single shot. In Bershad, the Black-Shlychniks captured four cannons and cartridges for them, two heavy machine guns and more than 120 horses. Captain Dyachenko lined up the captured Galicians and offered to transfer to the regiment. Only 50 riflemen agreed to become Cossacks. They were mainly gunners. The rest remained in the red camp.

April 1920 came . The army of Omelyanovich-Pavlenka, which has been fighting for the fifth month in isolation from the Ukrainian government, without receiving any help from it, has reached a critical limit. Lacking cartridges and shells, on April 14, 1920, she approached the city of Voznesensk , where the Reds had concentrated large stocks of weapons and equipment. The battle for Voznesensk was to decide the fate of the Ukrainian army. And this city had to be taken with bayonets and sabers. Not the last role in the liberation of Voznesensk was played by units of the Black Zaporizhia.

On May 6, 1920, in the Yampol region, a detachment of the Black Army met with a detachment of the 3rd Iron Division , which was advancing from the west. "The spirit of the army has risen, the mood is indescribable. Despite the terrible fatigue, the army is again ready to attack the enemy..."  - recalled UNR political officer Vasyl Sovenko.

All participants of the Winter Campaign were awarded the Order of the Iron Cross . Petro Dyachenko was also awarded. And on June 23, 1920, he was promoted to the rank of colonel of the Army of the Ukrainian People's Republic .

Wounded near Burshtyn 
In the summer of 1920, Dyachenko, at the head of his regiment, launched an attack on Burshtyn. The attack was through peatlands and hayfields, cut with ditches for water drainage. The enemy was retreating behind the haymakers. The rear guard of the Reds sat down in the ditches by the road and covered the retreat of their unit with machine gun fire. Enemy guns were also firing. Petro Dyachenko decided to use a flank attack to take over the enemy convoy, full of weapons and other military equipment, which the Zaporizhia were sorely lacking. With his saber raised, without looking back, the commander galloped on his swift-footed horse. During the attack, Petro Dyachenko was knocked off his horse, he received a serious injury - a fractured thigh bone. Cossacks carried the wounded commander from the battlefield. When he was lying under a pear tree with a broken leg, an enemy grenade hit the tree itself. Surprisingly, it did not break. Without completing a full course of treatment,

Camps for Internees 
1920, like the previous year, ended with the November catastrophe. Petro Dyachenko and his fellow black men were sent to internment camps. He did not waste time - he arranged for his horsemen to join the Polish army, and tried to improve their living conditions. He himself worked as an ordinary worker. In 1921 - 1924  - in camps for internment . He had two sons in Poland. Yuriy was born on July 11, 1923 , Oles on December 27, 1928 . This year, on July 20 , Petro Dyachenko, in order not to lose his military qualifications and earn money to support his family, went to the Polish Army.

Officer of the Polish Army 
From July 20, 1928 , he served as a major in the Polish Army. Here are his positions in this army: so-called. at. the commander of the machine gun squadron (end of 1928), the commander of the line squadron (second half of 1931  ) of the 1st cavalry regiment named after Józef Pilsudski, assistant to the 1st deputy commander of the 3rd regiment of the Masovian cavalry brigade "Suwalki" ( November 1, 1934  — September 30, 1939 ). During his service, Petro Dyachenko graduated from the Higher Military School ( October 21, 1932  - November 1, 1934 ).

In 1936, the commander of the "Suwalka" cavalry brigade, Colonel Rudolph Kresher, gave the following assessment to the contract major of the Polish Army, Petro Dyachenko:

In 1934, he graduated from the Higher Military School.

The Second Liberation Competition 
World War II found Petro Dyachenko on the Polish-Lithuanian border in Suwalki. As a contract officer of the Polish Army, Petro Dyachenko defended Poland against the Soviet troops in September 1939. In the battles against the Red Army over the Nieman river, he was wounded. His cavalry division fought its way to Lithuania, where it was interned.

Later, Dyachenko ended up in a camp for Polish officers near Königsberg. Soon the Germans released him, like many other Ukrainian senior officers. Dyachenko immediately reported to Volodymyr Salskyi, the Minister of Defense of the Government of the Ukrainian People's Republic .

On 25 June 1941, the Ukrainian General Council of Combatants was created in Kraków, which mainly included senior officers UPR Army. Mykhailo Omelyanovych-Pavlenko headed the Council, Vsevolod Petriv and Antin Kravs became his deputies. Petro Dyachenko became a member of its military-scientific and military-historical council, and on July 5, 1941, he headed the headquarters of the Ukrainian People's Revolutionary Army of Taras Bulba-Borovets. But soon he suddenly left his post. The head of the economic department of the regional military headquarters of the UPA-North group, Roman Petrenko, claimed that Dyachenko explained to him the reasons for his resignation.

In the future, Petro Dyachenko cooperated with the Organization of Ukrainian Nationalists  — both with supporters of Stepan Bandera and with Andriy Melnyk, as well as with the Germans, in particular with their Sicherheitsdienst. Using his official position, he supplied Ukrainian insurgents with firearms, German military documents, and placed wounded insurgents in German hospitals.

From March 1944, Dyachenko ("Flower") participated in the organization of the Ukrainian Self-Defense Legion in the Kholm region (in German documents it was called the 31st SD battalion). In June of the same year, Dyachenko became the deputy commander of the Ukrainian Self-Defense Legion, its chief of staff, and in August he headed the legion. The unit numbered up to 570 soldiers, including 16 senior officers and 20 sub-senior officers.

Researcher Roman Koval believes that at the head of the Ukrainian Self-Defence Legion, Petro Dyachenko participated in the suppression of the Warsaw Uprising and battles against Polish partisans - Polish Home Army and the Bataliony Chłopskie.

On 30 January 1945, Colonel Petrov Dyachenko turned 50 years old. In February, he became the commander of the 3rd Infantry Regiment of the Ukrainian Liberation Army as part of the Wehrmacht. At the end of February 1945, with the permission and assistance of the Germans, he began to form a separate Ukrainian anti-tank brigade "Free Ukraine". Its basis was made up of senior officers UPR army, former Red Army soldiers and Ukrainians from the auxiliary anti-aircraft and fire-fighting units of erlin. Petro Dyachenko personally staffed the team.

On 28 March 1945, the soldiers of the brigade swore allegiance to Ukraine. The oath contained the following words:

In April 1945, the German command included the "Free Ukraine" brigade in the "Herman Göring" tank corps of Army Group Center. Petro Dyachenko, at the head of a brigade, had to participate in the battles near Bautzen (Dresden district) - against units of 1st Belorussian Front and the 2nd Army of the Polish Army. Soon, Dyachenko's brigade was thrown into the capture of Görlitz-Lobau. SS Standardenführer Otto Skorzeny was in overall command .

At the end of April, in fierce battles, the "Free Ukraine" brigade captured 300 Red Army soldiers. Among the trophies were four cannons, 5 regimental mortars, more than 400 horses, 20 machine guns, and a lot of military property. The 19th Infantry Regiment of the 7th Division of the Polish Army was also defeated by Dyachenko's militants, taking the division commander, General Lilevskyi, prisoner. Ukrainians were also among the prisoners, 50 of them joined the brigade on the same day. At the most critical moment of the battle, when the Poles launched a decisive offensive, Petro Dyachenko himself led the counterattack of the Ukrainians. This decided the fate of the battle in favor of the Ukrainian brigade.

On the same day, Wehrmacht lieutenant general Wilhelm Schmalz, commander of the German Goering Parachute Tank Corps, personally awarded Petro Dyachenko with the Iron Cross. The success of the Ukrainian brigade was mentioned in a special message.

At the end of the war, Petro Dyachenko was appointed commander of the 2nd Ukrainian Division of the Ukrainian National Army (the total number of its soldiers reached seven thousand). On 7 May 1945, in the area of ​​the city of Tetchen, near the bridge on the Elbe, UNA commander Pavlo Shandruk promoted Petro Dyachenko to the rank of lieutenant general. And the very next day, Dyachenko's brigade was surrounded. Its soldiers had to go over 200 km through territories where the Red Army was already operating. Less than a third of the soldiers of the "Free Ukraine" brigade got into the American zone, the rest died or were captured by the Red Army. And several dozen hid in the forests of the Sudetenland foothills. Later, they reached Oleśnica County, where they established contact with the OUN-B, which operated in Lower Silesia (it was headed by Roman Koza-"Bogun"), fighting against the Reds until the early 1950s.

Dyachenko's military career ended in May 1945. In order not to fall into the hands of those against whom he fought while defending the UPR, he was forced to surrender to the Americans.

Dyachenko served in various armies for 25 years, thirteen of them on the fronts of various wars. He served in the Tsarist Army, Russian army of the Provisional Government, the Armed Forces of the Ukrainian State of Pavel Skoropadskyi, in the Army of the Ukrainian People's Republic, in the Polish Army, in the Ukrainian People's Revolutionary Army of Taras Bulba-Borovets, the Wehrmacht and the Ukrainian National Army .

On emigration 
After the war, Petro Dyachenko lived for some time in Munich. He consulted representatives of American military intelligence who studied the real forces of the Liberation Movement in Ukraine. Later, together with his new wife Elena and her son Petro, General Dyachenko moved to the USA and settled in Philadelphia . After leaving for the USA, the old soldier's life was closed in the narrow circle of family life, he devoted a lot of time to his son and wife Elena. He was engaged in the cultivation of flowers, in particular he loved roses, he was fond of photography and started writing memoirs. In 2010, the magazine "America" published his memoirs "Black Zaporozhets" - about the fate of the regiment of black soldiers in 1919-1920. He himself, having survived two wars and the loss of both sons, was silent, wrote little and sparingly about himself. Since Petro Dyachenko did not directly command the Second Brigade, which was half of the Second Division, in his memoirs he writes only about the First Brigade he led.

On February 1, 1961, the government-in- exile of the Ukrainian People's Republic granted Dyachenko the rank of lieutenant general, noting in the order to consider him lieutenant general from October 15, 1928. The last rank of Petro Dyachenko was lieutenant general of the Army of the Ukrainian People's Republic .

He died on April 23, 1965. He is buried at St. Andrew's Ukrainian Orthodox Cemetery in South Bound Brook , New Jersey. Metropolitan Ioan and Archbishop Mstislav took part in the funeral. Colonel-General Pavlo Shandruk from the troops of the Army of the People's Republic of Ukraine and the Ukrainian National Army saw off their friend on his last journey. In the spring of 1918, together with Petro Dyachenko, as part of the Crimean group of Petro Bolbochan, they liberated the Crimea from the Bolsheviks . On behalf of the Knights of the Order of the Iron Cross, the senior officer of the regiment spoke Black Zaporozhians, at that time already the general-corporal Volodymyr Gerasymenko. The speeches were made by the corporal general of the Army of the Ukrainian People's Republic of Ukraine Arkady Valiysky and other soldiers, including Valentyn Simyantsiv, a famous Ukrainian sculptor, a Cossack of the 3rd hundred of the Black Zaporozhian regiment .

Archive of the General 
Petro Dyachenko's wife Olena carefully organized her husband's memoir legacy. In the magazine "Visti kombatanta" (part 3 for 1967), she published a list of works that were kept in the family. From this publication you can learn that Petro Dyachenko wrote the following works:

 "Organization of an anti-tank brigade" (with diagrams);
 "Horse regiment of the Black Zaporozhets" (manuscript - 74 pages of typescript; manuscript - 97 pages of typescript);
 "Anti-tank brigade "Free Ukraine" (4 sheets - 8 handwritten pages);
 "Notes to the History of the Black Zaporozhian Regiment" (4 sheets — 8 handwritten pages);
 "Horse Hundred" (a small handwritten school notebook);
 "Cavalry Hundred, Cavalry Division named after Colonel Pyotr Bolbochan" (notebook with number 2);
 "Horse Regiment" (notebook with the number 3);
 "Formation and first battle of the Ukrainian Anti-Tank Brigade" (three sheets written in ink and three sheets written in pencil);
 "Petro Dyachenko, colonel of the Ukrainian Army" (10 sheets and two pages, handwritten);
 "Winter Campaign" (abstract delivered on the anniversary of the Winter Campaign of the UNR Army) and other articles.

In addition to manuscripts, there were also: a folder with personal documents, a folder with photographs, clippings from Polish communist newspapers about Petro Dyachenko and correspondence (letters from generals Pavlo Shandruk, Pyotr Samutyn , Mykhailo Sadovskyi , Dmytro Zhupinas, colonels Mykola Rybachuk, I. Lypovetskyi, N Shkilny , P. Kalinovsky, Makar Kaplysty , brother Viktor Dyachenko, centurions Zenon Stefanov and Gonta (apparently Ivan Lyuty-Lyutenko ), sub-chiefs and Cossacks of the Black Zaporozhian regiment Petro Pervukhin, Serhiy Hnyda, Valentin Simyantsiv and others.

Mrs. Olena Dyachenko appealed to everyone who has letters from Petro Dyachenko to put them in the general archive, which will be transferred to the relevant institution after the final arrangement.

Family 
He was married twice. From his first marriage, he had two sons, Yuriy (born on July 11, 1923) and Olesya (born on December 27, 1928), who died in World War II, and in his second marriage with his wife Elena, they raised a son, Peter (a sergeant in the American Air Force , a participant in the Vietnam War ).

His brother is Viktor Gavrylovich Dyachenko, he served in the Russian Imperial Army, the Soviet Socialist Republic, the Army of the Ukrainian People's Republic, the Polish Sich, and the Ukrainian National Army. 

Dyachenko's nephew was the writer and literary critic Leonid Ivanovich Sukachev.

Commemoration 
Petro Dyachenko's grave at St Andrew Ukrainian Orthodox Cemetery, South Bound Brook, New Jersey, USA

 On October 12, 1968, a solemn consecration of a monument took place at the St Andrew Ukrainian Orthodox Cemetery - a bust of Petro Dyachenko, where he is depicted in a Cossack cap with a plume. Ukrainian veterans were present at the event. Archbishop Mstislav performed the consecration ceremony . The choir performed under the direction of Professor I. Palivoda . The sculptor is Valentyn Simyantsiv, a Cossack of the 3rd hundred of the Black Zaporozhian regiment.

Valentyn Simyantsiv recalled that pointing to the monument, Bishop Mstislav said that the community can do a lot when there are people in it who will devote time and work to public affairs. Vladyka reminded that on the conscience of the former soldiers lies an unfulfilled duty to the glorious memory of the soldiers buried in this cemetery, on whose graves today only temporary wooden crosses stand.

After sending home, Mrs. Olena Dyachenko and her son Petro invited those present to a feast. And at the table, Archbishop Mstislav developed an opinion about "the duty of the military and the community to take care of the graves of former soldiers and called on those present to make donations for this noble goal . "

Museum of liberation struggles 1917-1921 in Berezova Luka

 A commemorative sign was erected in his honor in his native village, Berezova Luka , and there is also a museum of liberation struggles 1917-1921, dedicated to Petro Dyachenko.
 Petro Dyachenko Street is in the city of Voznesensk. Petro Dyachenko took part in the legendary Battle of Voznesensk, during which he liberated the city from the invaders.
 On July 28, 2022, part of Levanevsky Street in the city of Bila Tserkva was renamed Petro Dyachenko Street.

Sources 

 Serhiy Kovalenko. Black Zaporizhia: history of the regiment. 2nd edition. — Kyiv: Styx Publishing House , 2015. — 368 p.
 Taras Bulba-Borovets . "Army without a state", "Volyn", Winnipeg, 1981, Canada
 Volodymyr Bilyaev. "On the boundless wing..." - Donetsk: Eastern Publishing House, 2003. - 348 p.
 Ivan Burtyk . The Thorny Path of the 2nd UNA Division, New York, 1991 [ Archived March 16, 2022 at the Wayback Machine .]
 Yurii Gorlis-Gorskyi . Cold ravine. [ Archived June 4, 2013 at the Wayback Machine .]
 Roman Koval . Petro Dyachenko, Chieftain of the Black Zaporozhians. [ Archived July 20, 2008 at the Wayback Machine .]
 Alexander Panchenko. General Petro Dyachenko is a fighting eagle of the Ukrainian army [ Archived October 3, 2013 at the Wayback Machine .]
 Who was and is in the city of Gadyach [ Archived May 18, 2017 at the Wayback Machine .]
 Tynchenko Ya. Yu. Officer Corps of the Army of the Ukrainian People's Republic (1917—1921). Book I. — K  .: Tempora , 2007. — ISBN 966-8201-26-4 .
 Tynchenko Ya. Yu. Officer Corps of the Army of the Ukrainian People's Republic (1917—1921). Book II . — K. _ : Tempora , 2011. — 355 p. — ISBN 978-617-569-041-3 .

References

External links
 Petro Dyachenko
 

1895 births
1965 deaths
People from Poltava Oblast
People from Mirgorodsky Uyezd
Ukrainian generals
Russian military personnel of World War I
Ukrainian people of World War I
Polish military personnel of World War II
Ukrainian collaborators with Nazi Germany
Polish emigrants to the United States
American people of Ukrainian descent
Recipients of the Cross of St. George
Recipients of the Iron Cross (1939), 2nd class